Senasuru Maruwa is a 2012 Sri Lankan Sinhala action drama film directed by Udayakantha Warnasuriya and co-produced by Udayakantha Warnasuriya, Ranjith Jayasooriya and Pravin Jayarathne. It stars Channa Perera and Sheshadri Priyasad in lead roles along with Buddhika Jayarathna and Lucky Dias. Music composed by Dillon Lamb. It is the 1167th Sri Lankan film in the Sinhala cinema.

The film has been shot in and around Dambulla, Mullative in October 2010.

Plot

Cast
 Lucky Dias as Mahil
 Channa Perera as Nisal
 Sheshadri Priyasad as Anuththara
 Buddhika Jayarathna as Viraj
 Nadeeka Gunasekara as Anuththara's mother
 Kanthi Lanka as Viraj's mother
 Indika Ginige as Ranjan
 Nimal Anthony
 Ajith Weerasinghe
 Senaka Wijesinghe
 Sampath Jayaweera
 Mervyn Dhanawardena Guruge as Minister

Soundtrack

Awards
 2013 Derana Lux Film Festival Award for the Best Villain - Buddhika Jayaratne
 2013 Derana Lux Film Festival Award for the Best Action Direction - Teddy Vdyalankara
 2013 Derana Lux Film Festival Award for the Best Lyrics - Sunil Wimalaweera

References

External links
සෙනසුරු මාරුව plot

2012 films
2010s Sinhala-language films
2012 action drama films
Sri Lankan drama films
Films directed by Udayakantha Warnasuriya